Lesley Vance (October 23, 1939 – November 3, 2015) was an American politician.

Born in Phenix City, Alabama, Vance owned a funeral home. He served as county commissioner for Russell County, Alabama and was a member of the Alabama House of Representatives from 1994 to his death in 2015. He was a member of the Democratic Party but switched to the Republican Party about two weeks after the November, 2010 general election.

Vance died at a hospice in Columbus, Georgia on November 3, 2015, from colon cancer at the age of 76.

References

1939 births
2015 deaths
American funeral directors
People from Phenix City, Alabama
County commissioners in Alabama
Republican Party members of the Alabama House of Representatives
Democratic Party members of the Alabama House of Representatives
Place of death missing